Redding Township is one of twelve townships in Jackson County, Indiana, United States. As of the 2010 census, its population was 4,233 and it contained 1,786 housing units.

Geography
Lakes in this township include Peters Lake. The streams of Sand Creek and Thompson Slough run through this township.

Cities and towns
 Seymour (northeast edge)

Unincorporated towns
 Fleming
 Little Acre
 Reddington
 Rockford

Extinct towns
 Conologue
 Peters Switch

Adjacent townships
 Sand Creek Township, Bartholomew County (north)
 Geneva Township, Jennings County (northeast)
 Spencer Township, Jennings County (east)
 Jackson Township (south)
 Hamilton Township (west)
 Wayne Township, Bartholomew County (northwest)

Cemeteries
The township contains two cemeteries: Glasson and Riverview.

Major highways
  Interstate 65
  U.S. Route 31
  State Road 11

References
 U.S. Board on Geographic Names (GNIS)
 United States Census Bureau cartographic boundary files

External links
 Indiana Township Association
 United Township Association of Indiana

Townships in Jackson County, Indiana
Townships in Indiana